Massaya TV (Arabic قناة مسايا الفضائية) is a private Syrian satellite television station based in Damascus and in Dubai. It is specializing in broadcasting events, concerts and weddings particular in Syria and the Arab World. Massaya TV offers also interviews with specialists in beauty and make-up and  also specialists in art lighting and photography.

Programs
One of the most important programs produced by the channel in Syria are:
 Massaya al-Kheir Suriya (مسايا الخير سوريا)
 Al-Afrah wa Al-Araas (Weddings and Weddings, الافراح والاعراس)
 Akhbar Faan min Suriya (Art News from Syria, أخبار فن من سوريا)
 Hafalat Ayad el-Milad wa el-Munasabat (Christmas concerts and events,  حفلات اعياد الميلاد والمناسبات)
The channel also produces programs in Egypt like:
 Marah fi Farah (مرح في فرح)
 Massaya al-Kheir min al-Qahira (مسايا الخير من القاهرة)
 Al-Naharda Farahi (النهاردة فرحي)
As well as programs of Dubai Events and Arab Weddings from different places.

Station's offices
Massaya TV has many offices around the Arab World, most notably in Syria, which is the main office and other offices are in Dubai, Cairo and Lebanon.

References

External links
Massaya TV official website 

Arabic-language television stations
Television channels in Syria
Mass media in Damascus
Mass media in Dubai